Pleasant Grove Independent School District is a public school district in Texarkana, Texas.

History

The 55-square mile area formerly included several smaller districts, and the first one-room school was established in 1877. The Baker District and the Morriss district united in 1916 to form Pleasant Grove School District.

The district was renamed Pleasant Grove Independent School District in September 1978. Pleasant Grove operated only an elementary school for many years. Pleasant Grove Junior High School opened in August 1977 and is now known as Pleasant Grove Middle School. In 1983, voters approved the expansion of the educational program through grade 12. The first class of seniors graduated in May 1986. The new high school facility was opened in August 1986. Since 1986, three bonds have been passed to serve the needs of the growing district and provide students and staff with updated facilities. In October 2008, Pleasant Grove Intermediate School opened for grades 3-5. In May 2010, the Pleasant Grove High School competition gym and multipurpose facility opened to meet the needs of our student athletes and extracurricular activities. Most recently in November 2020, the Margaret Fischer Davis Elementary School opened to relocate our current elementary students and staff members to a state of the art facility at 2800 Galleria Oaks.

Mission and Vision Statement

The mission of the Pleasant Grove Independent School District is to ensure high levels of learning for all students. The vision of the Pleasant Grove Independent School District is to align policies, programs, and practices to reflect the commitment to ensuring high levels of learning for all students.

Accreditation 
All schools in the Pleasant Grove Independent School District are fully accredited by the Southern Association of Colleges and Schools and the Texas Education Agency.

2021 Points of Pride 

 "A" Accountability Rating from Texas Education Agency
 UIL 4A District Academic Champions
 Top 100 National Scholastic Press Association Yearbooks in the Country
 2021 Overall Theatre Team State Champions
 2 4A Division II State Football Championships in 4 Years
 87 National Scholastic Art Gold and Silver Key Awards Received
 Over 171 Career and Technology Education Certification earned by high school students
2020 Texas Education Agency Hero for Children, Jessica Rich

Schools
Pleasant Grove High School (Grades 9-12)
Pleasant Grove Middle School (Grades 6-8)
Pleasant Grove Intermediate School (Grades 3-5)
Pleasant Grove Elementary School (Grades PK-2)

References

External links
Pleasant Grove ISD

School districts in Bowie County, Texas
Texarkana, Texas